David Skaats Foster (1852-1920) was an American writer and coal and iron merchant.

He was born in Utica, New York, the son of Thomas Foster and Eliza P. Skaats. His father was also a merchant, "was prominent in railroad building" and was Vice President of the Utica City National Bank.  In 1874 he married Marry C. Williams. His wife died in 1895. He had two sons, the twins Gerard S. Foster and Bernard D. Foster (b. 1880). 

His 1914 novel, "The Road to London" was adapted into a film in 1921.

Bibliography 
 The Romance of the Unexpected (1887),poems 
 Rebecca the Witch: And Other Tales in Metre (1888), poems
 Casanova the Courier (1892)
 Ellinor Fenton, an Andirondack Story (1893), re-released as "Our Uncle William ; also, Nate Sawyer"
 Spanish Castles by the Rhine: A Triptychal Yarn (1897)
 Prince Timoteo (1899) 
 Flighty Arethusa (1910)
 The Road to London (1914)
 The Divided Medal (1914)
 The Kidnapped Damozel ; The Oval Diamond ; Alraschid in Petticoates (1915)
 The Lady of Castle Queer (1919)
 Mademoiselle of Cambrai (1920)

References

American writers
Writers from Utica, New York
1852 births
1920 deaths